Kuala Lumpur League is a state level football league held in Kuala Lumpur. The league is managed by football authority in Kuala Lumpur, the KLFA. It is the fifth-tier football league in Malaysia. Teams are also eligible to compete in the Malaysia FA Cup. 

The league has a hierarchical format with promotion and relegation between different divisions. Starting from 2018, promotion to the newly established fourth-tier league called Malaysia M4 League is also possible.

Champions 
Since 2017-18 season

Super League

Division 1

Division 2

KLFA Cup

References

4
Malay